The Cisco Scouts were a West Texas League baseball team based in Cisco, Texas, United States that played from 1920 to 1921. In 1921, they changed their name to the Cisco Orphans, but eventually disbanded.

Major league players Joe Bratcher and Tim Griesenbeck played for them.

References

Baseball teams established in 1920
Defunct minor league baseball teams
Defunct baseball teams in Texas
Baseball teams disestablished in 1921
1920 establishments in Texas
1921 disestablishments in Texas
Cisco, Texas